The miner's inch is a unit of flow in terms of volume per unit time, usually in relation to the flow of water. The definition of a miner's inch varies by location.

In hydraulic mining and some forms of placer mining, as well as ore dressing, a large and regular supply of water is needed. The miner's inch is a method of measuring the amount of flow a particular water supply system (such as a flume or sluice) is capable of supplying.

The miner’s inch measures the amount of water that would flow through a slot of a given area at a given pressure (for example, at a head of 6 inches of water, or 1.5 kPa). In miner's inch he word inch refers to the area of the slot in square inches, while the pressure in inches of water refers to the height of water above the slot.  A variable-width slot can be used to modify the flow rate.

Definition
Historically, the unit lacked a firm definition or equivalent measurement, and varied by location, leading to confusion within the mining industry. In 1905, its usage in California was standardized. Today, the standards are:

1/60 ft³/s (472 mL/s) New Zealand
1/50 ft³/s (566 mL/s) southern California, Idaho, Kansas, Nebraska, New Mexico, North Dakota, South Dakota, Utah, Washington
1/40 ft³/s (708 mL/s) Arizona, northern California, Montana, Nevada, Oregon
1/38 ft³/s (745 mL/s) Colorado
1/36 ft³/s (787 mL/s) British Columbia

State regulations sometimes forbid the use of the unit without its being associated with a definition in the same document.

References

External links
description at sizes.com
Arizona government definition
California definition (Water Code section 24)
Idaho government definition
Nevada government definition
South Dakota government definition

Units of flow